Liselotte Herrmann (called "Lilo", 23 June 1909 – 20 June 1938, executed) was a German Communist Resistance fighter in Nazi Germany.

Life 
Born in Berlin, Liselotte Herrmann, an engineer’s daughter, had a middle class liberal upbringing. After completing her Abitur exams in 1929, she went to work as a laboratory assistant in a chemical factory to prepare her studies in chemistry. Later that year, her family moved to Stuttgart, where she attended the Technical College. In 1931, she switched to biology, studying at the Humboldt University in Berlin.

As a schoolgirl, she joined the Young Communist League of Germany in 1928, and also became a member of the Red Students’ League (Roter Studentenbund). She also joined the Revolutionary Union Opposition (Revolutionäre Gewerkschafts Opposition) in 1931, and in the same year became a member of the Communist Party of Germany (KPD).

Opposition activities 
Soon after the NSDAP won the election in 1933, she together with 111 other students signed a "Call for the Defence of Democratic Rights and Freedoms" and was therefore reprimanded and expelled by the university on 11 July 1933. From that time, she worked illegally against Germany's Nazi government and socialized with the armed resistance within the KPD organisation.

She temporarily took a job as a nanny and on 15 May 1934, her son Walter was born. The boy's father, Fritz Rau, a KPD official, had died in Gestapo custody. In September of the same year, she once again moved to Stuttgart, where she worked as a shorthand typist at her father's engineering office and re–established contacts with the banned Communist Party. From late 1934, she worked as a technical aide to the Württemberg KPD leader, Stefan Lovász, until his arrest in June 1935. She obtained information about German re-armament concerning secret weapons projects — munitions production at the Dornier aircraft factory in Friedrichshafen and the building of an underground ammunition factory (Muna) near Celle — which were relayed to the KPD's office in exile that had been set up in Switzerland.

Arrest, trial, and death 
On 7 December 1935, Hermann was arrested in her family's apartment. For three months, she was interrogated at the Stuttgart police prison, and from February 1936 she was held for 16 harrowing months in remand custody, whilst her young son had to be cared for by his grandparents. Herrmann's fellow party member, Lina Haag, was held in the same remand prison at that time, and remembers the night she was sentenced in her book A Handful of Dust or How Long the Night.

Despite international protests, Hermann was sent to the guillotine on 20 June 1938. Lovász, Steidle and Göritz were also put to death the same day.

Controversy 
In East Germany, many schools, streets, and institutions were named after her, but after German reunification in 1990, many were given new names to erase all references to Communism.

Indeed, even in Stuttgart, where Herrmann studied, she has been a controversial figure. In 1988, unknown persons placed a simple memorial stone to her on the University of Stuttgart campus, which caused a stir. "Lilo-Herrmann-Weg" was the city's tribute to her, but it is little more than a 100 m-long blind alley affording access to public and private parking. No one lives there. In the 1970s, students at the university tried to get a new residence named after her, but the university administration refused.

Literature 
 Alfred Behr: Ein schwäbischer Streit der Historiker um ein Denkmal. Ende einer DDR-Legende über Lilo Hermann, in: FAZ, Nr. 29 vom 4. Februar 1993, S. 4
 Max Burghardt: Briefe, die nie geschrieben wurden. Lilo Hermann zum Gedächtnis, Verl. Neues Leben, Berlin, 1966
 Ditte Clemens: Schweigen über Lilo. Die Geschichte der Liselotte Hermann, BS-Verl., Rostock 2002, 
 Deutsche Widerstandskämpfer 1933–1945. Biographien und Briefe, Dietz, Berlin, 1970 (vols. 1–2)
 Stephan Hermlin: Die erste Reihe, Verl. Neues Leben, Berlin, 1959
 Karl-Heinz Jahnke (Hrsg.): Niemals vergessen! Aus dem antifaschistischen Widerstandskampf der Studenten Europas, Verl. Neues Leben, Berlin 1959
 Lothar Letsche (Hrsg.): Lilo Herrmann. Eine Stuttgarter Widerstandskämpferin, Vereinigung der Verfolgten des Naziregimes, Stuttgart 1993

References

External links 
 
 Tribute to Lilo Herrmann from the Marxist Library 
 University of Stuttgart alumnal record 
 Article about controversy over Lilo Herrmann memorials in Stuttgart 
 A brief biography 

1909 births
1938 deaths
Communist Party of Germany politicians
Executed communists in the German Resistance
People from Berlin executed at Plötzensee Prison
Female resistance members of World War II
People executed by guillotine at Plötzensee Prison
Executed German women